Bob Manning (February 1, 1926 – October 23, 1997) was an American big band singer who was popular in the 1950s, and well known through his radio and television appearances.

Biography 
Manning was born Manny Levin on February 1, 1926.

Manning was first spotted on Arthur Godfrey's Talent Scouts and first gained notice as Ziggy Elman's vocalist after first touring with local bands and singing on local radio stations.  He recorded for MGM Records with Elman and also with Art Mooney and Tommy Dorsey.

Manning was a featured singer on Rhythm on the Road, an hour-long weekly program on CBS in 1955.

In May 1954, Manning was a guest singer on Dave Garroway's television program.

Manning had hits as a soloist after signing to Capitol Records, most notable in with a cover of Glenn Millers, The Nearness of You

Manning's stepson is actor and voice artist Barry Gordon.

Manning died of pneumonia on October 23, 1997, aged 71.

Albums
 Lonely Spell (1955, Capitol)
 Our Wedding Songs (1958, Everest)
 Tommy Alexander Presents His Golden Trombones (1958, Everest; Manning on four tracks)

Hit singles

References

External links
 Bob Manning's recording of The Nearness of You from Internet Archive

Capitol Records artists
American male pop singers
Traditional pop music singers
1926 births
1997 deaths
Apollo Records artists
20th-century American singers
20th-century American male singers